Raina may refer to:

People

Given name
 Raina (singer), stage name of Oh Hye-rin (born 1989), lead singer of the South Korean girl group After School
 Raina A. Mercedes Echerer (born 1963), Austrian actress and politician
 Raina Hein (born c. 1988), American model and runner-up on America's Next Top Model (cycle 14)
 Raina Kabaivanska (born 1934), Bulgarian opera singer
 Rayna Knyaginya (1856–1917), Bulgarian teacher and revolutionary 
 Raina Telgemeier (born 1977), American cartoonist

Surname
 Ankita Raina (born 1993), Indian tennis player
 M. K. Raina (born 1948), Indian theatre actor and director
 Mohit Raina, Indian actor
 Suresh Raina (born 1986), Indian cricketer
 Samay Raina (born 1997), Indian comedian

Fictional characters
 Raina Petkoff, the heroine in George Bernard Shaw's Arms and the Man
 Raina Thorpe, on the TV show Gossip Girl
 Raina, from Marvel's Agents of S.H.I.E.L.D.
 Raina, on the TV series Cleopatra 2525

Geography
Raina, Bardhaman, a village with a police station, in Bardhaman district, West Bengal, India
Raina I, community development block, in West Bengal, India
Raina II, community development block, in West Bengal, India
Raina (Vidhan Sabha constituency) in West Bengal India
Reineh (sometimes transliterated as Raina), an Arab town in Israel

See also
 Ratina (disambiguation)
 Reina (disambiguation)
 Reina (given name)